Nianta Diarra (born April 18, 1993) is a Malian professional basketball player who last played for Cholet Basket of the LNB Pro A. He is a member of the Malian national basketball team.

He played the 2017-18 season with Olympique Antibes, averaging 5.8 points and 4.8 rebounds per game. In July 2018 he signed with Boulazac.

On October 3, 2019, he has signed with Cholet Basket of the LNB Pro A.

References

External links
Nianta Diarra at realgm.com
Nianta Diarra at msb.fr

1993 births
Living people
21st-century Malian people
Boulazac Basket Dordogne players
Centers (basketball)
Cholet Basket players
HTV Basket players
Malian expatriate basketball people in France
Malian men's basketball players
Olympique Antibes basketball players
Sportspeople from Bamako
STB Le Havre players